Malek Saleem Abdullah (born 13 May 1985) is a Qatari professional basketball player.  He currently plays for Al Wakrah of the Qatari Basketball League.

He represented Qatar's national basketball team at the 2016 FIBA Asia Challenge in Tehran, Iran. There, he was his team's best free throw shooter.

References

External links
 Asia-basket.com Profile
 2016 FIBA Asia Challenge Profile
 FIBA Archive Profile

1985 births
Living people
Forwards (basketball)
People from Doha
Qatari men's basketball players
Asian Games medalists in basketball
Basketball players at the 2006 Asian Games
Asian Games silver medalists for Qatar
Medalists at the 2006 Asian Games
2006 FIBA World Championship players